The Independent Popular Council of Formentera (AIPF) was a  conservative political party on the island of Formentera, Spain. In 2011 the party was refounded as Sa Unió de Formentera.

References

Formentera
Political parties in the Balearic Islands